Aulonemia goyazensis is a species of bamboo in the genus Aulonemia.
It is part of the grass family and endemic to Latin America.

References

goyazensis